Neal Kedzie (born January 27, 1956) was a Republican member of the Wisconsin Senate, representing the 11th District from 2002-2014.

On May 6, 2014, Kedzie announced that he would not run for reelection; however, on June 16, 2014 he announced that he was resigning effective immediately rather than serving out his term, to accept new employment.  On July 1, 2014 he became the president of the Wisconsin Motor Carriers Association.

Wisconsin legislature

Prior to being elected to the Senate, Kedzie served three terms in the 43rd District of the Wisconsin State Assembly.  During his tenure in the Assembly, Kedzie served as the Chairman of the Environment Committee, Vice-Chairman of the Joint Committee on Tax Exemptions, and served as a member on several other committees including Financial Institutions, Natural Resources, and Aging and Long Term Care.

Kedzie served as Chairman of the LaGrange Town Board from 1988 through 1998. He also was the Chairman of the LaGrange Planning and Zoning Commission.  Kedzie was an eleven-year member of the Lauderdale-LaGrange Fire Department and currently holds the rank of Major in the Civil Air Patrol.

Professionally, Kedzie has a business and communications background having formerly worked as Local Relations Representative for Wisconsin Electric Power Company and as Commercial/Industrial Coordinator for Wisconsin Southern Gas Company.

Sponsored legislation

Among the statutes sponsored by Kedzie that became law during his tenure:
2009 WI Act 360 - Sign Language Interpreter Licensure
2005 WI Act 450 – Anti-Price Gouging
2005 WI Act 360 – Groundwater Quality
2005 WI Act 25 –  Eliminate taxation of Social Security income (in ’05-’07 Budget)
2005 WI Act 90 – Drug Paraphernalia
2005 WI Act 35 – Internet Hunting
2005 WI Act 305 – Municipal Court Collections	
2003 WI Act 276 – Green Tier
2003 WI Act 137 – Aldo Leopold Weekend
2003 WI Act 313 – Sale of deer hunt licenses
2003 WI Act 275 – Lake Districts
2003 WI Act 179 – Fellow Mortals
2003 WI Act 150 – Municipal Court Collections
2003 WI Act 312 – Drycleaner Cleanup Response Fund
2003 WI Act 88 – Special Wastes Usage
2003 WI Act 231 – TAF Districts
2003 WI Act 196 – Reckless/Intentional Homicide
2003 WI Act 244 – Firearm Sighting
2003 WI Act 66 – Forester Education Requirements
2003 WI Act 242 – Damaged Timber
2001 WI Act 6 – Isolated Wetlands
2000 WI Act 147 – Wetland Mitigation
2000 WI Act 146 – Local Roads Grant
1998 WI Act 142 – Credit Export Act
2007 Senate Bill 3 - Tax Free Pension Income
2007 Senate Bill 4 - Graduated Tax Exemption
2007 Senate Bill 449 - DUI Vehicle Restrictions
2007 Senate Bill 545 - Charitable Wine Auctions
2005 Senate Bill 310 – School Bullying
2005 Senate Bill 165 – Charter Towns
2005 Senate Bill 465 -  Postdated Worthless Checks

References

External links
 
11th Senate District, Senator Kedzie in the Wisconsin Blue Book (2005–2006)

Wisconsin state senators
Members of the Wisconsin State Assembly
1956 births
Living people
People of the Civil Air Patrol
21st-century American politicians
People from Elkhorn, Wisconsin